Nils Berntsen (17 January 1901 – 31 May 1929) was a Norwegian footballer. He played in one match for the Norway national football team in 1924.

References

External links
 

1901 births
1929 deaths
Norwegian footballers
Norway international footballers
Footballers from Oslo
Association football midfielders
Lyn Fotball players